Deluxe Paint, often referred to as DPaint, is a bitmap graphics editor created by Dan Silva for Electronic Arts and published for the then-new Amiga 1000 in November 1985. A series of updated versions followed, some of which were ported to other platforms. An MS-DOS release with support for the 256 color VGA standard became popular for creating pixel graphics in video games in the 1990s.

Dan Silva previously worked on the Cut & Paste word processor (1984), also from Electronic Arts.

History 
Deluxe Paint began as an in-house art development tool called Prism. As author Dan Silva added features to Prism, it was developed as a showcase product to coincide with the Amiga's debut in 1985. Upon release, it was quickly embraced by the Amiga community and became the de facto graphics (and later animation) editor for the platform. Amiga manufacturer Commodore International later commissioned EA to create version 4.5 AGA to bundle with the new Advanced Graphics Architecture chipset (A1200, A4000) capable Amigas. Version 5 was the last release after Commodore's bankruptcy in 1994.

Early versions of Deluxe Paint were available in protected and non copy-protected versions, the latter retailing for a slightly higher price. The copy protection scheme was later dropped. Deluxe Paint was first in a series of products from the Electronic Arts Tools group—then later moved to the ICE (for Interactivity, Creativity, and Education) group—which included such Amiga programs as Deluxe Music Construction Set (preceded by Music Construction Set for the Apple II), Deluxe Video, and the Studio series of paint programs for the Mac.

With the development of Deluxe Paint, EA introduced the ILBM and ANIM file format standards for graphics. While widely used on the Amiga, these formats never gained widespread end user acceptance on other platforms, but were heavily used by game development companies. Deluxe Paint was used by LucasArts to make graphics for their adventure games such as The Secret of Monkey Island, and the name of a particular filename used to store the main protagonist Guybrush Threepwood was probably at the origin of his peculiar name. One of the main artist developer of the game, Mark Ferrari, in an interview for The Making of Monkey Island 30th Anniversary Documentary remembers that «there was a pulldown menu in DPaint called brushes, so character sprites were referred to as brushes», and the male protagonist was simply "the guy.brush" until the artist Steve Purcell suggested to take the very name "Guybrush". The author Ron Gilbert remembers that the PC-DOS version of the file was named "guybrush.bbm".

Versions

Amiga

Deluxe Paint I was released in 1985. Most Amiga graphics editors were oriented towards the bitmapped and bitplaned display modes of the native Amiga chipset, and in Deluxe Paint this was most prominent.

The next year (1986) Deluxe Paint II was introduced, with support for color cycling. The Amiga natively supports indexed color, where a pixel's color value does not carry any RGB hue information but instead is an index to a colour palette (a collection of unique color values). By adjusting the color value in the palette, all pixels with that palette value change simultaneously in the image or animation. Creative artists could use this in their animation by using color cycling.

Deluxe Paint III appeared in 1988 and added support for Extra Halfbrite. New editing modes allowed one to stencil certain colors, and perform blurs on the stencils to produce an effect that could be made to look similar to light-sourcing in a 3D program. Deluxe Paint III added the ability to create cel-like animation, and animbrushes. These let the user pick up a section of an animation as an "animbrush", which can then be placed onto the canvas while it animates. Deluxe Paint III was one of the first paint programs to support animbrushes. This is similar to copy and paste, except one can pick up more than one image.

Deluxe Paint IV (introduced in 1991), which did not include Silva as the lead programmer, was significantly less elegant and crashed more often than the predecessors, though it did offer significant new features like non-bitplane-indexed Hold-and-Modify support.

Deluxe Paint 4.5 AGA appeared the following year, addressing the stability issues and providing support for the new A1200 and A4000 AGA machines and a revamped screen mode interface. It appeared in both standalone and Commodore-bundled versions.

The final release, Deluxe Paint V, in 1995, supported true 24-bit RGB images. However, using only the AGA native chipset, the 24-bit RGB color was only held in computer memory, the on-screen image still appeared in indexed color.

Apple IIGS 
DeluxePaint II for the Apple IIGS was developed by Brent Iverson and released in 1987.

MS-DOS 
Deluxe Paint II for PC came out in 1988, requiring MS-DOS 2.0 and 640 kB of RAM. It supported CGA, EGA, MCGA, VGA, Hercules and Tandy IBM-compatible PC graphic cards.

Deluxe Paint II Enhanced was released in 1989, requiring MS-DOS 2.11 and 640 kB of RAM.

Deluxe Paint II Enhanced 2.0, released in 1994, was the most successful PC version, and was compatible with ZSoft's PC Paintbrush PCX image format file. The MS-DOS conversion was carried out by Brent Iverson and its enhanced features were by Steve Shaw. It supported the CGA, EGA, MCGA and VGA IBM-compatible PC graphic cards, the Hercules, Tandy and Amstrad proprietary video cards and the main of the first Super VGA video cards (manufacturer dependent) modes, enabling it to support up to 800×600 pixel screen resolution with 256 (from 262,144) colors and 1024×768 pixels with 16 colors.

The sister product Deluxe Paint Animation (only for 320×200 pixels and 256 colors) was widely used, especially in the videogame industry.

Atari ST 
Deluxe Paint ST was developed by ArtisTech Development, published by Electronic Arts, and was released in 1990, supporting features such as the STE 4096-color palette.

Workflow 

"[" and "]" hotkeys could step through the indexed palette, turning indexed-pixel-painting into a fast two-handed mouse+keys process, and the right mouse button would paint with the background colour (instead of bringing up a context sensitive menu as is common in modern packages)

For example, transparency was obtained as simply as selecting a background colour index (a single right click on the palette GUI to change). Colours could be locked from editing by use of a stencil (a list of colour indexes whose pixels should not be altered in the image data). And simple colour-cycling animations could be created using contiguous entries in the palette. It was easy to change the hue and tone of a section of the image by altering the corresponding colours in the palette. (The specific section needed to use a dedicated part of the palette for this technique to work.)

Brushes can be cut from the background by using the box, freehand, or polygon selection tools. They can then be used in the same manner as any other brush or pen. This functionality is simpler to use than the "stamp" tool of Photoshop or Alpha Channels as provided in later programs. Brushes can be rotated and scaled, even in 3D. After a brush is selected, it appears attached to the mouse cursor, providing an exact preview of what will be drawn. This allows precise pixel positioning of brushes, unlike brushes in Photoshop CS3 and lower, which only show an outline.

Animations stored in IFF ANIM format were delta compressed (only the differences between current and previous frames are stored), making animations smaller and faster on playback.

Reception 
Compute! criticized the documentation of the first release of DeluxePaint as inadequate, but stated that "DeluxePaint is a visual arts program of immense scope and flexibility". In later versions the documentation was much improved; for instance DeluxePaint IV came with a 300-page manual.

Deluxe Paint was a hit for EA. The main line of the series, particularly installments one to three, has won a total of at least nine awards from independent publications and organizations, including three Amiga-specific awards. Deluxe Paint III also won Commodore International's Enterprise and Vision award in 1990, becoming the first software to win the award, for what the company's judges believed to be best utilizing the Amiga's graphical capabilities.

Uses 
Deluxe Paint was frequently used for making graphics for home computer games from the late 1980's to the early 1990's, and was used for games such as Another World, Dark Seed, Eye of the Beholder, The Secret of Monkey Island, and Wolfenstein 3D.

The music video for the 2003 single "Move Your Feet" by Danish alternative dance duo Junior Senior was created entirely using the Amiga version of Deluxe Paint by the art collective Shynola.

The webcomic "Unicorn Jelly" by Jennifer Diane Reitz was completed over the course of three years using Deluxe Paint 2, one panel posted every night at midnight.

British author and artist Molly Cutpurse used Deluxe Paint to create the video graphics for the 1989 film Murder on the Moon, starring Brigitte Nielsen.

Legacy 
After leaving EA in 1989, Silva went on to join the Yost Group, which developed Autodesk's 3D Studio.

In 2015, Electronic Arts released via the Computer History Museum the source code of "Deluxe Paint I" for historical reasons.

See also 

 Deluxe Paint Animation
 Brilliance (graphics editor)
 GrafX2
 List of raster graphics editors
 Comparison of raster graphics editors

References

External links 
 DeluxePaint I on the Computer History Museum
 Deluxe Paint in the Amiga Software Database
 Deluxe Paint Atari ST version review, 1990

Raster graphics editors
Amiga software
DOS software
Atari ST software
Graphics software
Electronic Arts
1985 software
Proprietary software